The 2015 Segunda División season, was the 70th edition of the second tier of Federación Peruana de Futbol. The tournament was played on a home-and-away round-robin basis.

The clubs Alfonso Ugarte, Defensor San Alejandro and Pacífico withdrew before the start of the season and were relegated to the Copa Perú.

The club Unión Fuerza Minera withdrew before the start the season due to financial problems.

The club San Simón was disabled and relegated to the Copa Perú for outstanding debts with the SAFAP.

Teams

Stadia and Locations

League table

Results

References

External links 

  
Tournament regulations 
Peruvian Segunda División news at Peru.com 
Peruvian Segunda División statistics and news at Dechalaca.com 
Peruvian Segunda División news at SegundaPerú.com 
 RSSSF

2
2015
2015 in South American second tier football leagues